William M. Newell (January 6, 1894 – February 21, 1967) was an American film actor.

Biography
Newell was most active in the 1930s, familiar to fans of the Our Gang short subjects in his recurring role as Alfalfa's father, and as Dr. Henley on Our Miss Brooks. Newell was cast as a hobo in "Little Boy Blew," one of the last episodes of the Walter Brennan sitcom, The Real McCoys, then airing on CBS.

He died in 1967 in Studio City, Los Angeles and is interred at the Westwood Village Memorial Park Cemetery.

Selected filmography

 Bombshell (1933) - Lola's Chauffeur (uncredited)
 The Woman in Red (1935) - Reporter (uncredited)
 Gold Diggers of 1935 (1935) - Newspaper Reporter (uncredited)
 Alias Mary Dow (1935) - Reporter (uncredited)
 Honeymoon Limited (1935) - Cop (uncredited)
 Here Comes the Band (1935) - Greasy (uncredited)
 Rendezvous (1935) - Carter's Receptionist (uncredited)
 Riffraff (1936) - Pete
 The Voice of Bugle Ann (1936) - Mr. Tanner
 Wife vs. Secretary (1936) - Tom Wilson (uncredited)
 Absolute Quiet (1936) - Bill Dahle, a Drunk Pilot (uncredited)
 Mariners of the Sky/Navy Born (1936) - Lt. Bill Lyons
 Fury (1936) - Roadside Service Station Owner (uncredited)
 San Francisco (1936) - Man in Breadline (uncredited)
 Sitting on the Moon (1936) - Mike
 Bulldog Edition (1936) - Charlie Hunter
 Libeled Lady (1936) - Divorce Detective
 Mr. Cinderella (1936) - First Hotel Clerk (uncredited)
 Robinson Crusoe of Clipper Island (1936, Serial) - Hank McGlaurie
 The Big Show (1936) - Lee Wilson
 Happy Go Lucky (1936) - Charlie Davis
 Beware of Ladies (1936) - Sniff
 The Mandarin Mystery (1936) - Detective Guffy
 A Man Betrayed (1936) - Gabby
 Larceny on the Air (1937) - Andrews
 Bill Cracks Down (1937) - Eddie 'Porky' Plunkett
 The Hit Parade (1937) - Burt Ambrose (uncredited)
 Make Way for Tomorrow (1937) - Ticket Seller (uncredited)
 Dangerous Holiday (1937) - Solitaire
 Rhythm in the Clouds (1937) - Clyde Lyons
 City Girl (1938) - Gas Station Attendant (uncredited)
 Yellow Jack (1938) - Soldier (uncredited)
 Speed to Burn (1938) - Policeman (uncredited)
 Sing You Sinners (1938) - Waiter (uncredited)
 Meet the Girls (1938) - 1st Waiter (uncredited)
 Slander House (1938) - Terry Kent
 Orphans of the Street (1938) - Charlie (uncredited)
 Ride a Crooked Mile (1938) - Kracaw (uncredited)
 There's That Woman Again (1938) - Waiter (uncredited)
 Alfalfa's Aunt (1939, Short) - John Switzer
 Honolulu (1939) - Second Intern (uncredited)
 Everybody's Baby (1939) - Waiter (uncredited)
 Rose of Washington Square (1939) - Hotel Clerk (uncredited)
 Invitation to Happiness (1939) - Waiter (uncredited)
 Good Girls Go to Paris (1939) - Nightclub Waiter (uncredited)
 Naughty but Nice (1939) - Arranger (uncredited)
 Second Fiddle (1939) - Make-Up Artist (uncredited)
 Mr. Smith Goes to Washington (1939) - Maxie T. Bookmaker (uncredited)
 The Housekeeper's Daughter (1939) - Reporter (uncredited)
 Little Accident (1939) - Photographer (uncredited)
 The Invisible Killer (1939) - Det. Sgt. Pat Dugan
 The Amazing Mr. Williams (1939) - Waiter (uncredited)
 The Great Victor Herbert (1939) - Fred Clayton (uncredited)
 Nick Carter, Master Detective (1939) - Taxi Driver (uncredited)
 Swanee River (1939) - Bill, Stagehand (uncredited)
 The Invisible Man Returns (1940) - Minor Role (uncredited)
 The Ghost Comes Home (1940) - Nightclub Waiter (uncredited)
 All About Hash (1940, Short) - Alfalfa's father
 The Doctor Takes a Wife (1940) - Soda Jerk (uncredited)
 Bubbling Troubles (1940, Short) - Alfalfa's Dad
 Hold That Woman! (1940)
 Andy Hardy Meets Debutante (1940) - Insurance Investigator (uncredited)
 The Great Profile (1940) - Reporter (uncredited)
 He Stayed for Breakfast (1940) - Waiter (uncredited)
 Good Bad Boys (1940, Short) - Alfalfa's Father (uncredited)
 Girl from Havana (1940) - Henry Hewitt (uncredited)
 Public Deb No. 1 (1940) - Reporter (uncredited)
 City for Conquest (1940) - Max's Lyricist (uncredited)
 Melody and Moonlight (1940) - Sailor (uncredited)
 Slightly Tempted (1940) - Warcross
 Mysterious Doctor Satan (1940, Serial) - Speed Martin
 Caught in the Act (1941) - Police Sergeant Riley
 The Strawberry Blonde (1941) - Man (uncredited)
 Blondie Goes Latin (1941) - Steward Ringing Chime and Crying (uncredited)
 Broadway Limited (1941) - Train Fireman (uncredited)
 San Antonio Rose (1941) - Headwaiter (uncredited)
 The Big Store (1941) - Press Photographer (uncredited)
 Puddin' Head (1941) - Studio Tour Guide (uncredited)
 Hello, Sucker (1941) - Mr. Giffle (uncredited)
 The Bride Came C.O.D. (1941) - McGee's Pilot
 Here Comes Mr. Jordan (1941) - Murdoch Handler (uncredited)
 Manpower (1941) - Lineman at Cafe Counter (uncredited)
 Ice-Capades (1941) - Harry Stimson (uncredited)
 World Premiere (1941) - Fireman (uncredited)
 Navy Blues (1941) - Shore Patrolman #1 (uncredited)
 Sailors on Leave (1941) - Stuffy (uncredited)
 You Belong to Me (1941) - Parking Attendant (uncredited)
 Three Girls About Town (1941) - Laundry Man (uncredited)
 The Devil Pays Off (1941) - Second Steward (uncredited)
 Miss Polly (1941) - Hubert - New Postman
 Skylark (1941) - Counterman (uncredited)
 Bedtime Story (1941) - Auto Court Manager (uncredited)
 Pardon My Stripes (1942) - Airport Clerk (uncredited)
 A Tragedy at Midnight (1942) - Swanson, Greg's Agent
 The Lady Is Willing (1942) - Counterman (uncredited)
 Two Yanks in Trinidad (1942) - Taxi Driver (uncredited)
 Who Is Hope Schuyler? (1942) - Perley Seymour
 A Desperate Chance for Ellery Queen (1942) - Reporter on Telephone (uncredited)
 Moonlight Masquerade (1942) - Bartender (uncredited)
 Calling Dr. Gillespie (1942) - Orderly with Tray of Water (uncredited)
 Priorities on Parade (1942) - Vendor (uncredited)
 Enemy Agents Meet Ellery Queen (1942) - Apartment Tenant (uncredited)
 Footlight Serenade (1942) - Writer (uncredited)
 The Old Homestead (1942) - Croupier (uncredited)
 Orchestra Wives (1942) - Hotel Clerk (uncredited)
 The Major and the Minor (1942) - Ticket Agent #2 (uncredited)
 Henry Aldrich, Editor (1942) - Process Server (uncredited)
 Get Hep to Love (1942) - Janitor (uncredited)
 You Can't Escape Forever (1942) - Reporter at Execution (uncredited)
 A Night to Remember (1942) - Police Photographer (uncredited)
 The Valley of Vanishing Men (1942, Serial) - Cavalry Sentry (uncredited)
 When Johnny Comes Marching Home (1942) - Taxicab Driver (uncredited)
 Ice-Capades Revue (1942) - Deakin (uncredited)
 Lady Bodyguard (1943) - Chef (uncredited)
 Keeper of the Flame (1943) - Piggot
 The Outlaw (1943) - Drunken Cowboy (uncredited)
 No Place for a Lady (1943) - Toreador Cafe Waiter (uncredited)
 The Meanest Man in the World (1943) - Photographer (uncredited)
 Slightly Dangerous (1943) - Waiter (uncredited)
 Good Morning, Judge (1943) - Bartender (uncredited)
 All by Myself (1943) - Price (uncredited)
 Honeymoon Lodge (1943) - Bartender (uncredited)
 Nobody's Darling (1943) - Bus Driver (uncredited)
 Johnny Come Lately (1943) - Vagrant (uncredited)
 Fired Wife (1943) - Bartender (uncredited)
 Top Man (1943) - Secretary (uncredited)
 Dangerous Blondes (1943) - Attendant (uncredited)
 Footlight Glamour (1943) - Taxi Driver #2 (uncredited)
 Sing a Jingle (1944) - Wiggins
 See Here, Private Hargrove (1944) - Mr. Smith (uncredited)
 Gypsy Wildcat (1944) - (uncredited)
 Kansas City Kitty (1944) - Gas Man (uncredited)
 Babes on Swing Street (1944) - Customer (uncredited)
 Irish Eyes Are Smiling (1944) - Hotel Clerk (uncredited)
 Bowery to Broadway (1944) - Reformer (uncredited)
 The Missing Juror (1944) - Wally—Counterman (uncredited)
 My Gal Loves Music (1944) - Soda Clerk (uncredited)
 Dancing in Manhattan (1944) - Waiter (uncredited)
 Together Again (1944) - Cabby (uncredited)
 Let's Go Steady (1945) - Cab Driver (uncredited)
 She Gets Her Man (1945) - Bettor (uncredited)
 Her Lucky Night (1945) - Proprietor
 Without Love (1945) - Soldier (uncredited)
 Honeymoon Ahead (1945) - Joe (uncredited)
 That's the Spirit (1945) - Detective (uncredited)
 Wonder Man (1945) - Man at Library (uncredited)
 Captain Eddie (1945) - (uncredited)
 Blonde from Brooklyn (1945) - Waiter (uncredited)
 On Stage Everybody (1945) - Mason (uncredited)
 The Lost Weekend (1945) - Liquor Store Proprietor (uncredited)
 The Dolly Sisters (1945) - Bartender (uncredited)
 Snafu (1945) - Cleaner (uncredited)
 Hit the Hay (1945) - Cab Driver (uncredited)
 Masquerade in Mexico (1945) - FBI Agent (uncredited)
 The Stork Club (1945) - Higgins - Judy's Chauffeur (uncredited)
 Out of the Depths (1945) - Charlie Anderson
 Adventure (1945) - Barber #1 (uncredited)
 Girl on the Spot (1946) - Lightfoot Lewis (uncredited)
 Breakfast in Hollywood (1946) - Cop with Bench Warrant (uncredited)
 Young Widow (1946) - Charlie (uncredited)
 The Kid from Brooklyn (1946) - Photographer (uncredited)
 House of Horrors (1946) - Deputy Coroner (uncredited)
 The Hoodlum Saint (1946) - Silver Web Waiter (scenes deleted)
 The Man Who Dared (1946) - Police Sgt. Clay
 The Runaround (1946) - Detective Moyer (uncredited)
 Inside Job (1946) - Store Detective (uncredited)
 Deadline for Murder (1946) - First Player (uncredited)
 Bowery Bombshell (1946) - Detective Dugan
 Till the End of Time (1946) - Warrant Officer (uncredited)
 Faithful in My Fashion (1946) - Phil Cummings - Jewelry Clerk (uncredited)
 The Magnificent Rogue (1946) - Stage Manager (uncredited)
 The Best Years of Our Lives (1946) - Waiter at Bank Dinner (uncredited)
 Dick Tracy vs. Cueball (1946) - Piano Player (uncredited)
 Wake Up and Dream (1946) - Blonde's Boy Friend (uncredited)
 Boston Blackie and the Law (1946) - Mr. Jones (uncredited)
 Alias Mr. Twilight (1946) - Delivery Man (uncredited)
 The Great Morgan (1946) - Film Character (uncredited)
 The Show-Off (1946) - Court Clerk (uncredited)
 Lady in the Lake (1946) - Drunk (uncredited)
 Angel and the Badman (1947) - Headwaiter (uncredited)
 Suddenly, It's Spring (1947) - Pier Manager (uncredited)
 Out of the Blue (1947) - Danny the Bartender (uncredited)
 That's My Gal (1947) - Sam (uncredited)
 The Trouble with Women (1947) - Court Clerk (uncredited)
 Second Chance (1947) - Pinky
 The Secret Life of Walter Mitty (1947) - Taxi Cab Traffic Manager (uncredited)
 Philo Vance's Secret Mission (1947) - Deputy (uncredited)
 Magic Town (1947) - Radio Comic in Montage (uncredited)
 Key Witness (1947) - Smiley
 Roses Are Red (1947) - Reporter (uncredited)
 Wedlock Deadlock (1947, Short)
 Road to Rio (1947) - Meat Stamper (uncredited)
 The Senator Was Indiscreet (1947) - Elevator Operator (uncredited)
 Killer McCoy (1947) - Waiter (uncredited)
 Doctor Jim (1947) - Editor
 Song of My Heart (1948) - Doorman
 If You Knew Susie (1948) - Empire Theater Janitor (uncredited)
 The Return of the Whistler (1948) - Hotel-Room Painter (uncredited)
 The Fuller Brush Man (1948) - Police Announcer (uncredited)
 Bob and Sally (1948) - Jean Andren
 Up in Central Park (1948) - Stage Manager (uncredited)
 The Babe Ruth Story (1948) - Brother Francis (scenes deleted)
 That Wonderful Urge (1948) - Reporter (uncredited)
 Blondie's Secret (1948) - Mr. Ford, Grocery Cashier (uncredited)
 The Lone Wolf and His Lady (1949) - Ava Rockling (uncredited)
 Mighty Joe Young (1949) - Man at Bar (uncredited)
 Tell It to the Judge (1949) - Bartender (uncredited)
 The Traveling Saleswoman (1950) - Bartender (uncredited)
 A Woman of Distinction (1950) - Bartender (uncredited)
 Ma and Pa Kettle Go to Town (1950) - Horace 'Hank' Hawkshaw, Police Desk Sergeant (uncredited)
 Kill the Umpire (1950) - Ted (uncredited)
 Louisa (1950) - Movie Usher (uncredited)
 To Please a Lady (1950) - Hank Harmon (uncredited)
 M (1951) - Detective Questioning Blonde About License Plate (uncredited)
 Only the Valiant (1951) - Corporal of the Guard (uncredited)
 Bright Victory (1951) - Todd - the Bartender (uncredited)
 Meet Me After the Show (1951) - Stage Manager (uncredited)
 Criminal Lawyer (1951) - Mac - Bartender (uncredited)
 Sunny Side of the Street (1951) - Recording Studio Engineer (uncredited)
 The Lady Pays Off (1951) - Bartender
 Wild Stallion (1952) - Sergeant (uncredited)
 High Noon (1952) - Jimmy - drunk with eye patch (uncredited)
 Young Man with Ideas (1952) - Party Waiter (uncredited)
 Models Inc. (1952) - Photo Studio Customer (uncredited)
 Here Come the Marines (1952) - Maj. Desmond - CIA
 Francis Goes to West Point (1952) - Drunk (uncredited)
 Bonzo Goes to College (1952) - Drunk (uncredited)
 Flat Top (1952) - Captain (uncredited)
 The I Don't Care Girl (1953) - Bartender (uncredited)
 Abbott and Costello Go to Mars (1953) - Drunk (uncredited)
 Let's Do It Again (1953) - Cabbie (scenes deleted)
 Hot News (1953) - Policeman (uncredited)
 Escape from Fort Bravo (1953) - Symore (uncredited)
 Wicked Woman (1953) - Pinball Player (uncredited)
 Riot in Cell Block 11 (1954) - Guard on Phone (uncredited)
 Tennessee Champ (1954) - Ring Announcer (uncredited)
 Phffft (1954) - Workman (uncredited)
 Seven Angry Men (1955) - Farmer Who Finds Body (uncredited)
 The Eternal Sea (1955) - Dining Room Captain (uncredited)
 Wichita (1955) - Bartender (uncredited)
 My Sister Eileen (1955) - Plumber (uncredited)
 Our Miss Brooks (1956) - Dr. Henley
 Mister Cory (1957) - Ned - Owner (uncredited)
 Short Cut to Hell (1957) - Hotel Manager (uncredited)
 The Missouri Traveler (1958) - Pos Neely
 The Sheepman (1958) - Bartender (uncredited)
 Last Train from Gun Hill (1959) - Harper House Clerk (uncredited)
 Toby Tyler (1960) - Jailbird (uncredited)
 Who Was That Lady? (1960) - Schultz (uncredited)
 Pollyanna (1960) - Mr. Hooper (uncredited)
 A Global Affair (1964) - Waiter (uncredited)

References

External links
 
 

1894 births
1967 deaths
People from Millville, New Jersey
American male film actors
Burials at Westwood Village Memorial Park Cemetery
20th-century American male actors